Faryal Mehmood is a Pakistani model and actress. She has played the role of Mehwish in Geo Entertainment's Baba Jani (2018). Mehmood has been profiled and featured in Gulf News, The News International, and MangoBaaz. Her mother is Pakistani singer Rohani Bano.

Personal life
In late 2019, Mehmood shared in an interview with Samina Peerzada that she was a victim of sexual harassment and that her stepfather had molested her when she was a child. Faryal Mehmood is an avid dancer.

On 28 May 2020, Mehmood married Daniyal Raheal, son of veteran actor Simi Raheal. Rumours surrounding their alleged separation began to spread later that year; on 13 December 2020, Mehmood publicly rejected these claims, commenting that she would "like you guys to leave my marriage up to me and @daniyalraheal and focus on issues that are important in your own lives."

Filmography

Film

Television

References

External links

21st-century Pakistani actresses
Living people
Pakistani television actresses
Actresses from New York City
Pakistani people of American descent
21st-century American actresses
Year of birth missing (living people)